Karapitiya Teaching Hospital located in Karapitiya, Galle is the largest Tertiary care centre in the Southern Province of Sri Lanka. It was established in 1982 and is the main training facility for the Faculty of Medicine, University of Ruhuna. The hospital consists of 1,624 beds, 54 wards and several other units. It is the third largest tertiary care hospital in the country. Karapitiya Hospital meets the health needs of people in Southern Province and also provides services to the people of the surrounding areas.

Administration
The hospital is administrated by the Ministry of Health in Sri Lanka and the hospital provides free health care services to the people all 24 hours of the day. The present director of the hospital is Dr. S.D.U.M.Ranga .

Healthcare facilities
In addition to the General medical and Surgical care, the hospital provides a wide variety of health care services such as,

Further the hospital also consists of out patient departments with many others clinics and a blood bank. Facilities for modern investigations are also freely available at the hospital.

See also
List of hospitals in Sri Lanka
Health in Sri Lanka

References

External links
 Ministry of Health, Sri Lanka

Hospitals established in 1982
Hospital buildings completed in 1982
Teaching hospitals in Sri Lanka
Central government hospitals in Sri Lanka
Hospitals in Galle District
University of Ruhuna
1982 establishments in Sri Lanka
Buildings and structures in Galle